Célio Alves Dias (born 8 December 1971) is a Macanese racing driver currently competing in the Macau Touring Car Championship. He is a former World Touring Car Championship driver, who made his debut in 2012.

Racing career
Dias began his career in 2009 in the Macau Touring Car Championship, he raced in the championship for several seasons and still does. In 2012 Dias made his World Touring Car Championship debut with China Dragon Racing driving a Chevrolet Lacetti in the Guia Race of Macau. In October 2013 it was announced that he would race at Macau again.

Racing record

Complete World Touring Car Championship results
(key) (Races in bold indicate pole position – 1 point awarded just in first race; races in italics indicate fastest lap – 1 point awarded all races; * signifies that driver led race for at least one lap – 1 point given all races)

† — Driver did not finish the race, but was classified as he completed over 90% of the race distance.

References

External links
 

1971 births
Living people
World Touring Car Championship drivers
Macau racing drivers
Macanese people